John J. Broadmeadow (born 1961) is a retired lieutenant general in the United States Marine Corps, who served as Director of the Marine Corps Staff (DMCS) and was replaced by major general Gregg P. Olson in 2020. He previously served as the Deputy Commander of United States Transportation Command. Broadmeadow was commissioned upon graduating from Norwich University in 1983.

References

1961 births
Living people
Place of birth missing (living people)
Norwich University alumni
Webster University alumni
United States Army War College alumni
United States Marine Corps generals